Rosemont may refer to:

Places

Canada
Rosemont–La Petite-Patrie, a borough of Montreal, Quebec, Canada
Rosemont—La Petite-Patrie, a federal electoral district in Montreal, Quebec
Rosemont (provincial electoral district), a provincial electoral district in Quebec
Rosemont, Calgary, a neighbourhood in Calgary, Alberta, Canada

United States
Rosemont, California
Rosemont, Illinois
Rosemont, Baltimore, a neighborhood in Baltimore, Maryland
Rosemont, Maryland, in Frederick County
Rosemont, Nebraska
Rosemont, Hunterdon County, New Jersey
Rosemont, Mercer County, New Jersey
Rosemont, Ohio
Rosemont, Pennsylvania

Historic buildings

Australia
 Rosemont (Woollahra), a heritage-listed residence in New South Wales

United States
Rosemont (Wilmington, Delaware), listed on the U.S. National Register of Historic Places
Rosemont (Woodville, Mississippi), listed on the NRHP in Mississippi
Rosemont (Briarcliff Manor, New York), an NRHP contributing property
Rosemont Plantation, Waterloo, South Carolina, listed on the NRHP in South Carolina
Rose Mont (Gallatin, Tennessee), listed on the NRHP in Tennessee
Rosemont House (Waxahachie, Texas), listed on the NRHP in Ellis County, Texas
Rosemont Historic District (Alexandria, Virginia), listed on the NRHP in Virginia
Rosemont (Powhatan, Virginia), listed on the NRHP in Virginia
Rosemont Historic District (Martinsburg, West Virginia), listed on the NRHP in West Virginia

Other
Rosemont (horse), an American Thoroughbred racehorse
Rosemont College, a college in Rosemont, Pennsylvania
Rosemont High School, a high school in Sacramento, California
Rosemont Theatre, a concert hall in Rosemont, Illinois
Allstate Arena, a sports & entertainment arena in Rosemont, Illinois (formerly known as the Rosemont Horizon, or informally as Rosemont)

See also
Rosemont Historic District (disambiguation)
Rosemont station (disambiguation)
Rosemount (disambiguation)

Rosenberg (disambiguation), the German analogue corresponding to red or rose + hill/mountain